Andrew Geza Farkas (May 2, 1916 – April 10, 2001) was an American football fullback in the National Football League (NFL) for the Washington Redskins and the Detroit Lions.

Early life
Farkas was born in Clay Center, Ohio of Hungarian origins, and attended St. John's High School in Toledo for two years before moving to Detroit, Michigan and graduating from the University of Detroit Jesuit High School.

College career
Farkas played college football at the University of Detroit Mercy.

Professional career
Farkas was drafted in the first round of the 1938 NFL Draft by the Washington Redskins, where he played from 1938 to 1944, and finished his career with the Detroit Lions in 1945.  He also led the Redskins in rushing and scoring in 1938-39 and 1942–43, as well as helped lead the Redskins to an NFL Championship in 1942.  He led the NFL in scoring and all-purpose yards in 1939.

One of the highlights of his seven-year tour was catching a 99-yard touchdown pass from Frank Filchock on October 15, 1939.  He was elected to the Michigan Sports Hall of Fame, the Ohio Sports Hall of Fame and founded the Gus Dorais Foundation at the University of Detroit in 1955.  In 2002, Farkas was named one of the 70 greatest Redskins in team history.

Farkas was pictured wearing eye black as far back as 1942 and is credited as the first player in the NFL to wear it.

References

External links
 
 

American football fullbacks
Detroit Lions players
University of Detroit Jesuit High School and Academy alumni
People from Ottawa County, Ohio
Detroit Titans football players
Washington Redskins players
1916 births
2001 deaths
American people of Hungarian descent